Jalan Lama Alor Gajah or Jalan Dato' Dol Said, Federal Route 191, is a federal road in the state of Malacca, Malaysia. The road connects Kampung Gajah Mati to Kampung Melekek. The Kilometre Zero of the Federal Route 19 starts at Kampung Melekek.

History
The road used to be a part of Federal Route 19.

Features
At most sections, the Federal Route 191 was built under the JKR R5 road standard with partial access control, with a speed limit of 90 km/h.

List of junctions and towns

References

Malaysian Federal Roads
Roads in Malacca